The 1982 All-Big Ten Conference football team consists of American football players chosen by various organizations for All-Big Ten Conference teams for the 1982 college football season.  

Michigan receiver Anthony Carter was a first-team pick for the third consecutive year, a unanimous first-team selection by the conference coaches, and also a consensus All-American. Eight Michigan players were selected as a first-team players, including Carter, running back Lawrence Ricks, offensive guard Stefan Humphries, defensive back Keith Bostic.  Ohio State and Wisconsin followed with five first-team players each.

Offensive selections

Quarterbacks
 Tony Eason, Illinois (AP-1; UPI-1)
 Steve Smith, Michigan (AP-2)
 Babe Laufenberg, Indiana (UPI-2)

Running backs
 Lawrence Ricks, Michigan (AP-1; UPI-1)
 Tim Spencer, Ohio State (AP-1; UPI-1)
 Mel Gray, Purdue (AP-2; UPI-2)
 Eddie Phillips, Iowa (AP-2)
 Ricky Edwards, Northwestern (UPI-2)

Wide receivers
 Anthony Carter, Michigan (AP-1; UPI-1)
 Mike Martin, Illinois (AP-1; UPI-2)
 Duane Gunn, Indiana (AP-2; UPI-1)
 Gary Williams, Ohio State (AP-2; UPI-2)

Tight ends
 Cliff Benson, Purdue (AP-1)
 John Frank, Ohio State (UPI-1)
 Jon Harvey, Northwestern (AP-2; UPI-2)

Centers
 Tom Dixon, Michigan (AP-1; UPI-1)
 Joel Hilgenberg, Iowa (AP-2; UPI-2)

Guards
 Stefan Humphries, Michigan (AP-1; UPI-1)
 Joe Lukens, Ohio State (AP-1; UPI-1)
 Bill Humphries, Minnesota (AP-2; UPI-2)
 Jim Sakanich, Indiana (AP-2)
 Randy Rasmussen, Minnesota (UPI-2)

Tackles
 Chris Hinton, Northwestern (AP-1; UPI-1)
 Rich Strenger, Michigan (AP-1)
 Bob Winckler, Wisconsin (AP-2; UPI-1)
 John Alt, Iowa (AP-2)
 Brett Miller, Iowa (UPI-2)
 Bill Roberts, Ohio State (UPI-2)

Defensive selections

Defensive linemen
 Mark Bortz, Iowa (AP-1; UPI-1)
 Jerome Foster, Ohio State (AP-1; UPI-1)
 Tim Krumrie, Wisconsin (AP-1; UPI-1)
 Darryl Sims, Wisconsin (AP-1; UPI-1)
 Smiley Creswell, Michigan State (AP-2; UPI-2)
 Matt Hernandez, Purdue (AP-2; UPI-2)
 Karl Mecklenburg, Minnesota (AP-2; UPI-2)
 Dan Gregus, Illinois (AP-2)
 Winfred Carraway, Michigan (UPI-2)

Linebackers
 Carl Banks, Michigan State (AP-1; UPI-1)
 Paul Girgash, Michigan (AP-1; UPI-1)
 Marcus Marek, Ohio State (AP-1; UPI-1)
 Robert Thompson, Michigan (AP-1; UPI-1)
 Mike Boren, Michigan (AP-2; UPI-2)
 Mark Brown, Purdue (AP-2; UPI-2)
 Glen Cobb, Ohio State (AP-2; UPI-2)
 Larry Station, Iowa (AP-2)
 David Frye, Purdue (UPI-2)

Defensive backs
 Keith Bostic, Michigan (AP-1; UPI-1)
 David Greenwood, Wisconsin (AP-1; UPI-1)
 Bob Stoops, Iowa (AP-1)
 Matt Vanden Boom, Wisconsin (AP-2; UPI-1)
 Charles Armstead, Illinois (AP-2; UPI-2)
 Craig Swoope, Illinois (AP-2; UPI-2)
 Shaun Gayle, Ohio State (UPI-2)

Special teams

Placekicker
 Mike Bass, Illinois (AP-1; UPI-1)
 Ali Haji-Sheikh, Michigan (AP-2; UPI-2)

Punter
 Reggie Roby, Iowa (AP-1; UPI-1)
 John Kidd, Purdue (AP-2; UPI-2)

Key
Bold = Selected as a first-team player by both the media (AP) and coaches (UPI)

AP = Associated Press, "selected by a panel of sports writers and broadcasters throughout the Midwest"

UPI = United Press International, selected by the Big Ten Conference coaches

See also
1982 College Football All-America Team

References

All-Big Ten Conference
All-Big Ten Conference football teams